The Balkan Finance Investment Group (Balfin Group) is one of the largest private investment groups in Albania and the Balkans. It owns some of the largest companies in Albania.

The Group's investment portfolio can be categorized into activities for the development of real estate, retail, trade or industrial space, services, finance of customer, mining industry, tourism, energy, banking and agriculture. Balfin Group is a major player in the Albanian and international markets operating in seven countries.

History 
The beginnings of Balfin Investment Group started in 1993 in Vienna, where Samir Mane founded Alba-Trade. Having started with the trade of electronic devices, soon the BALFIN Group, created by Mane managed to create the largest network of electronics stores in Albania, Neptun and then extending the network in the neighboring countries of Kosovo and Macedonia. Neptun's chain of stores was positioned from the beginning in 1993 as the main electronics player in the Albanian market supplying the demand with the best brands and latest technology. Today this business created by Mane counts 28 stores in Albania and more than 27 in Kosovo and North Macedonia.

In 2005, Balfin Group built QTU, the first shopping center, revolutionizing the way that Albanians used to shop. In 2011, Balfin Group built a second shopping center TEG, the most modern and biggest shopping center in Albania and the region. In the same year, Jumbo Albania, the largest toy store in the Balkans became part of BALFIN Group.

From 2005 until 2011, several companies were created or became part of BALFIN Group such as: Fashion Group ALBANIA, ACREM, FoodWay, Elektro-Servis.

In 2012, Balfin Group started building Tirana Logistic Park, designed to provide services not only to Albanian businesses, but primarily offering an international standard service. Immediately after starting the construction of this important project, Balfin Group concluded one of the most important investments of the group abroad, Skopje City Mall, which was sold a few years later.

In 2013, Balfin Group acquired 100% the shares of ACR Holding, which is now called AlbChrome. AlbChrome is the leader in the mining and metallurgy industry in Albania, the Balkans and the second largest in Europe.

In 2015, Balfin Group started the construction of Green Coast Resort & Residences, the first premium resort located on Caesar's Beach in Palasa, Albania. The beachfront Resort has finished delivering the villas built in the first and second phase and is now constructing  phase 3 and 4 (Final) including a 5 star international brand hotel.

REAL ESTATE – Balfin Group is distinguished for large investments in construction field. The group started the activity in the field of construction in the early of 2000, first focusing on the construction of residential and commercial areas in Albania, offering high quality buildings and elite services. Latter the Group expanded its activity in the construction of Commercial and Industrial areas, elite and tourism projects not only in Albania, but also in North Macedonia, Austria etc. Balfin Real Estate & Hospitality, offers for sales premium real estate properties for both Albanians and international buyers. With a portfolio of 270 million € and a considerable client database, it offers the highest standard in professionalism not limited to the selling process, but also in the management, rental and real estate projects.

In the same year AgroCon Albania was established, developing its activity in the field of agriculture for the production of agricultural products, wholesale and retail of agricultural products in Albania and abroad. SPAR became part of Balfin in 2016, intending major investment and an expansion of SPAR in Albania. A joint venture established by Milsped and Balfin Group in 2017, Stella Mare, is representative of Maersk Line Company, the largest group of shipping containers in the world, offering its services in Albania.

Balfin Group continued to expand even in 2018 when Skopje East Gate (SEG), which was established in 2017, announced a large investment in North Macedonia, including a shopping center, and several blocks of residential and business complexes.

In 2018, Balfin Group concluded the acquisitions of Dyqan Taxi, the largest online retailer in Albania, NewCo Ferronikeli, the largest exporter of Kosovo and one of the largest producers of nickel in Europe, and Tirana Bank, the first private bank in Albania.

Subsidiaries 
ManeTCI
Neptun Electronics
AlbChrome
Tirana Bank
Spar Albania
Balfin Real Estate & Hospitality
Green Coast Resort & Residences
Skopje East Gate
Jumbo Albania
Newco Ferronikeli
Tirana Logistic Park
Tirana East Gate
Fashion Group Albania
Skopje East Gate

Notes

References 

1993 establishments in Albania
Investment companies of Albania